The 2012 Magyar Kupa, known as ( for sponsorship reasons), is the 86th edition of the tournament.

Quarter-finals

Quarter-final matches were played on 29 and 30 September 2012.

|}

Final four

The final four will be held on 10 and 11 November 2012 at the Komjádi Béla Sportuszoda in Budapest.

Semi-finals

Final

See also
 2012–13 Országos Bajnokság I

External links
 Hungarian Water Polo Federaration 

Seasons in Hungarian water polo competitions
Hungary
Magyar Kupa